The 1994 AFL Foster's Cup was the Australian Football League pre-season cup competition played in its entirety before the 1994 season began.

Games

1st Round

|- bgcolor="#CCCCFF"
| Home team
| Home team score
| Away team
| Away team score
| Ground
| Crowd
| Date
|- bgcolor="#FFFFFF"
| Collingwood
| 13.14 (92)
| North Melbourne
| 13.13 (91)
| Waverley Park
| 25,708
| Saturday, 19 February 
|- bgcolor="#FFFFFF"
| St Kilda
| 14.12 (96)
| Richmond
| 17.14 (116)
| Waverley Park
| 18,662
| Monday, 21 February 
|- bgcolor="#FFFFFF"
| Adelaide
| 16.17 (113)
| West Coast
| 14.10 (94)
| Football Park
| 28,776
| Wednesday, 23 February 
|- bgcolor="#FFFFFF"
| Fitzroy
| 12.13 (85)
| Geelong
| 10.11 (71)
| Waverley Park
| 9,080
| Wednesday, 23 February 
|- bgcolor="#FFFFFF"
| Sydney
| 18.11 (119)
| Footscray
| 16.10 (106)
| Robertson Oval
| 5,525
| Saturday, 26 February 
|- bgcolor="#FFFFFF"
| Carlton
| 11.18 (84)
| Hawthorn
| 14.15 (99)
| Waverley Park
| 26,117
| Saturday, 26 February 
|- bgcolor="#FFFFFF"
| Brisbane
| 18.18 (126)
| Melbourne
| 14.10 (94)
| Gabba
| 4,728
| Sunday, 27 February

Quarter-finals

|- bgcolor="#CCCCFF"
| Home team
| Home team score
| Away team
| Away team score
| Ground
| Crowd
| Date
|- bgcolor="#FFFFFF"
| Collingwood
| 15.15 (105)
| Richmond
| 7.14 (56)
| Waverley Park
| 26,913
| Monday, 28 February 
|- bgcolor="#FFFFFF"
| Adelaide
| 15.18 (108)
| Fitzroy
| 13.8 (86)
| Waverley Park
| 5,494
| Wednesday, 2 March 
|- bgcolor="#FFFFFF"
| Sydney
| 14.10 (94)
| Hawthorn
| 20.13 (133)
| Waverley Park
| 11,785
| Saturday, 5 March
|- bgcolor="#FFFFFF"
| Essendon
| 15.19 (109)
| Brisbane
| 6.11 (47)
| Waverley Park
| 11,383
| Sunday, 6 March

Semi-finals

|- bgcolor="#CCCCFF"
| Home team
| Home team score
| Away team
| Away team score
| Ground
| Crowd
| Date
|- bgcolor="#FFFFFF"
|  Collingwood
| 7.10 (52)
| Adelaide
| 13.11 (89)
| Waverley Park
| 12,222
| Wednesday, 9 March 
|- bgcolor="#FFFFFF"
| Hawthorn
| 13.9 (87)
| Essendon
| 15.12 (102)
| Waverley Park
| 21,418
| Saturday, 12 March

Final

|- bgcolor="#CCCCFF"
| Home team
| Home team score
| Away team
| Away team score
| Ground
| Crowd
| Date
|- bgcolor="#FFFFFF"
| Adelaide
| 9.14 (68)
| Essendon
| 15.12 (102)
| Waverley Park
| 43,925
| Saturday, 19 March

See also

List of Australian Football League night premiers
1994 AFL season

References

Australian Football League pre-season competition
Fosters Cup, 1994